Justice Taylor may refer to:

 Alan Taylor (Australian judge) (1901–1969), justice of the High Court of Australia
 Clarence J. Taylor (1894–1988), associate justice of the Idaho Supreme Court
 Claude A. Taylor (1902–1966), chief justice of the South Carolina Supreme Court
 Clifford Taylor (born 1942), chief justice of the Michigan Supreme Court
 David Taylor (Wisconsin judge) (1818–1891), associate justice of the Wisconsin Supreme Court
 Herman H. Taylor (1877–1929), justice of the Idaho Supreme Court
 John Louis Taylor (1769–1829), chief justice of the North Carolina Supreme Court
 John M. Taylor (Alabama judge) (1788–1856), justice of the Alabama Supreme Court
John Taylor (Mississippi judge) (c. 1785–1820), justice of the Mississippi Supreme Court
 Peter Taylor, Baron Taylor of Gosforth (1930–1997), Lord Chief Justice of England and Wales
 R. Fenwick Taylor (1849–1928), associate justice of the Florida Supreme Court
 Steven W. Taylor (born 1949), associate justice of the Oklahoma Supreme Court
 William A. Taylor (1928–2010), justice of the Wyoming Supreme Court
 William H. Taylor (judge) (1863–1926), associate justice of the Vermont Supreme Court
 William M. Taylor (1876–1959), associate justice of the Texas Supreme Court

See also
Judge Taylor (disambiguation)